The Spruce Street Harbor Park is an urban park located in Penn's Landing in Philadelphia, Pennsylvania.  Open during the summer, the place features a boardwalk along the Delaware River with a beachfront atmosphere.  Fireworks were planned around the Independence Day holiday, though the main fireworks were scheduled for the Benjamin Franklin Parkway on July 4 itself.

The park's features include a beachfront with a boardwalk along the Delaware River and about 100 hammocks hang under thousands of LED lights hung in the trees during the night. There are multiple restaurants and pubs or bars. The park has hammock lounges  and two barges available for reservation. On Saturdays, it is host to the Art Star Pop Up Market, where local artist sell candles, soaps, ceramics, art, home goods, jewelry and more.

History
In 2014, Philadelphia inaugurated the first Harbor Park festival which was planned with beer gardens to start a new tradition they referred to as "Summer in the city".

See also
List of parks in Philadelphia

References

Penn's Landing
Tourist attractions in Philadelphia
Parks in Philadelphia